Ptichy Island is the name of several islands in the Russian Far East:

Ptichy Island (Kamchatka Krai), an island in the eastern Sea of Okhotsk, off western Kamchatka
Ptichy Island (Shantar Islands), an island in the western Sea of Okhotsk

Islands of the Russian Far East